Ray County Courthouse is a historic courthouse located at Richmond, Ray County, Missouri.  It was built in 1914, and is a three-story, Classical Revival style Bedford limestone building.  It is five bays by seven bays and features paired colossal Ionic order columns supporting a pediment on each of the four facades.The Ray County Courthouse is similar to looks and design of the Livingston County Courthouse in Chillicothe, Missouri.  Both buildings were designed by the same architect. 

It was added to the National Register of Historic Places in 1979.

References

County courthouses in Missouri
Courthouses on the National Register of Historic Places in Missouri
Neoclassical architecture in Missouri
Government buildings completed in 1913
Buildings and structures in Ray County, Missouri
National Register of Historic Places in Ray County, Missouri